Akunk or Akunq may refer to:
Akunk, Gegharkunik, Armenia
Akunk, Aragatsotn, Armenia
Akunk, Kotayk, Armenia
Çaykənd, Shusha, Nagorno-Karabakh